Forestport Tower was a guyed, steel tower, insulated from the earth, so that the entire structure was used to radiate electromagnetic waves in the VLF (Very Low Frequency; 3 kHz to 30 kHz) and LF (Low Frequency; 30 kHz to 300 kHz) bands.  The tower was located near Forestport in Oneida County, New York, United States. Forestport Tower was built in 1950. It had a height of 1218 ft (371.25 metres). Forestport Tower was used for experimental transmissions in the LF and VLF-range; some of these included the first tests of the LORAN-C and Omega Navigation System.
On April 21, 1998 it was demolished by explosives.

External links
 http://www.jproc.ca/hyperbolic/loran_c_history.html
 https://web.archive.org/web/20050317143111/http://www.rl.af.mil/div/IFO/IFOI/IFOIPA/press_history/pr-98/pr-98-28.html
 http://www.skyscraperpage.com/diagrams/?b57103
 Datasheet: Forestport LORAN Radio Mast

Buildings and structures in Oneida County, New York
Radio masts and towers in the United States
Towers in New York (state)
1950 establishments in New York (state)
Towers completed in 1950
1998 disestablishments in New York (state)
Buildings and structures demolished in 1998